The Canadian Reformed Theological Seminary is a Reformed seminary in Hamilton, Ontario. It is the federational seminary of the Canadian Reformed Churches.

History
Synod Orangeville (1968) made the decision to establish a Theological College of the Canadian Reformed Churches on Wednesday, November 20, 1968, and to appoint three full-time professors and two lecturers. The College was officially opened in September 1969 in Hamilton, Ontario.  The Ontario legislature granted degree-granting authority to the Seminary under the Canadian Reformed Theological College Act, 1981. Since 1984, the Faculty is made up of four full-time professors. The seminary moved to a new location on the Hamilton escarpment in 1985. In 2010, the operating name was changed to the Canadian Reformed Theological Seminary.

Programs
 Master of Divinity (M.Div.) (4 years), includes a Pastoral Training Program
 Bachelor of Theology (B.Th.) (3 years)
 Diploma of Theological Studies (Dip.Th.St.) (2 years)
 Diploma of Missiology (Dip.M.) (8 months)

Faculty
There are five full-time faculty members:
 Dr. Jannes Smith - Professor of Old Testament
 Dr. William den Hollander - Professor of New Testament
 Dr. Jason P. Van Vliet - Professor of Dogmatology
 Dr. Arjan J. de Visser - Professor of Ministry and Mission
 Dr. Theodore G. Van Raalte - Professor of Ecclesiology
Besides the full-time staff, guest lectures and courses are occasionally taught by several adjunct lecturers.

Charter and Accreditation
The college is an accredited private degree-granting institution. It received charter from Ontario Ministry of Education under the Canadian Reformed Theological College Act, 1981.  It is accredited by the Association of Theological Schools.

See also

Ontario Student Assistance Program
Higher education in Ontario

References

External links 
 Canadian Reformed Theological Seminary

Reformed church seminaries and theological colleges in Canada
Educational institutions established in 1969
Education in Hamilton, Ontario
Evangelical seminaries and theological colleges in Canada
1969 establishments in Ontario